Sarcodon is a genus of fungi in the family Bankeraceae, which is part of the order Thelephorales known for its almost universal ectomycorrhizal life style. The genus owes its name to the presence of teeth-like spines on the hymenophore, it is derived from ancient Greek; sarco = flesh and odon = tooth. This is why they are commonly called "tooth fungi", or "Hydnoid fungi".

Several species of the Sarcodon genus, including Sarcodon imbricatus (see figure), are edible. The fungus can be bitter, but that is less apparent in younger specimens. In China, it is a popular edible mushroom and it is used for lowering of cholesterol level, muscles relaxation and blood circulation. Isolates from the genus, called Scabronines, may increase nerve growth factor synthesis in vitro.

Traits  
Sarcodon species have yellow to brown tinted basidiospores, with lengths in the range of 7.4-9 µm. The basidiomata is often soft and fleshy.

Species 
, Index Fungorum listed 49 valid species of Sarcodon. However, in 2019 Larsson et al. transferred 12 species into the genus Hydnellum.

 Sarcodon aglaosoma
 Sarcodon atroviridis
 Sarcodon bubalinus
 Sarcodon caliginosus
 Sarcodon calvatus
 Sarcodon carbonarius
 Sarcodon catalaunicus
 Sarcodon conchyliatus
 Sarcodon cyanellus
 Sarcodon cyrneus
 Sarcodon dissimulans
 Sarcodon excentricus
 Sarcodon harrisonii
 Sarcodon humilis
 Sarcodon ianthinus
 Sarcodon illudens
 Sarcodon imbricatus
 Sarcodon lanuginosus
 Sarcodon leucopus
 Sarcodon pakaraimensis
 Sarcodon portoricensis
 Sarcodon praestans
 Sarcodon procerus
 Sarcodon quercophilus
 Sarcodon quietus
 Sarcodon regalis
 Sarcodon rimosus
 Sarcodon roseolus
 Sarcodon rutilus
 Sarcodon scabripes
 Sarcodon squamosus
 Sarcodon stereosarcinon
 Sarcodon subfelleus
 Sarcodon thwaitesii
 Sarcodon umbilicatus
 Sarcodon ussuriensis
 Sarcodon ustalis
 Sarcodon wrightii

References 

 
Thelephorales genera